Sali-ye Bozorg (also Romanized as Sālī-ye Bozorg; also known as Sālī and Hazārgīri) is a village in Koregah-e Sharqi Rural District, in the Central District of Khorramabad County, Lorestan Province, Iran. At the 2006 census, its population was 883, in 162 families.

References 

Towns and villages in Khorramabad County